Beat Royalty is a Los Angeles based music production team. It was founded in 2005 by Dutch music producers Chris Kooreman and Edo Plasschaert and is part of  EMI Music Publishing.  Before Kooreman and Plasschaert formed Beat Royalty they worked under the name Big 'n Nasteez.

In 2007, the company produced several songs for teen-singing group JammX for veteran TV-producer Merv Adelson's Lightforce entertainment. In 2008, Beat Royalty produced Dutch singer Sabrina Starke's debut album Yellow Brick Road which was released October 1. The album was initially released on Dutch independent label Star-K Records but was slated for a re-release on Blue Note late 2008. The released version went gold in the Netherlands on March 9.

As of 2006, the team has expanded with collaborations with EMI-signed songwriters/producers Vie Le and Lawrence August.

References
 NlPop; Famed jazz label Blue Note signs Sabrina Starke (Dutch)
De Telegraaf Sabrina Starke "tekent bij Blue Note"(Dutch)
Dutch National Broadcasting company Sabrina Starke tekent bij Blue Note (Dutch)
Mental recordings-bio, tour dates, track listing
Sabrina Starke
EMI page dedicated to Beat Royalty
Discogs page on Beat Royalty
Jammx official's site
Vie Le's EMI profile
Lawrence August's EMI profile

External links
Official Beat Royalty page
Beat Royalty at Myspace

Record production duos